Events from the year 1543 in Ireland.

Incumbent
Monarch: Henry VIII

Events
April 19 – George Dowdall is nominated as Archbishop of Armagh (Church of Ireland) by King Henry VIII of England following the death of George Cromer; he is consecrated in December.
July 1
 Murrough O'Brien surrenders his Irish royalty to King Henry VIII of England and in the same year becomes a member of the Privy Council of England and is raised to the Peerage of Ireland as 1st Earl of Thomond and 1st Baron Inchiquin and may have reconstructed Dromoland Castle.
 Ulick na gCeann Burke is created 1st Baron of Dunkellin and 1st Earl of Clanricarde in the Peerage of Ireland.
November 10 – Thomas Butler is created 1st Baron of Caher in the Peerage of Ireland.

Births

Deaths
March 16 – George Cromer, Archbishop of Armagh (Church of Ireland).
Muirgheas mac Pháidín Ó Maolconaire, scribe.

References

 
1540s in Ireland
Ireland
Years of the 16th century in Ireland